Etter is a surname. Notable people with the surname include:

Albert Etter (born 1872), American horticulturist
Bill Etter (born 1950), American football quarterback
Bob Etter (born 1945), American football placekicker, bridge player, and professor
Carrie Etter (born 1969), American poet
David Wayne Etter (born 1944), American Material delivery engineer
Lior Etter (born 1990), Swiss footballer
Maria Woodworth-Etter (1844–1924), evangelist
Philipp Etter (1891–1977), Swiss politician
William H. Etter (born c. 1957), retired United States Air Force lieutenant general

See also
Etter, California, former name of Ettersburg, California
Etter, Minnesota, an unincorporated community
20804 Etter, main-belt asteroid